The Coffs Harbour International Stadium (known as the C.ex Coffs International Stadium under a sponsorship arrangement) is an Australian stadium located in the coastal city of Coffs Harbour, New South Wales.

The stadium was opened in June 1994, and has a capacity of 20,000 people, although the seating capacity in the stand is only 1,000. The record attendance for a sporting event is 12,000.

The stadium claims a place in the FIFA World Cup records as the venue for the highest scoring match in World Cup qualification history. It hosted the match in which Australia beat American Samoa 31–0 on 11 April 2001.

North Coast Football play their Over 35s matches and finals matches at Coffs Harbour International Stadium.

The stadium regularly hosts NRL trial matches, and formerly hosted ING Cup cricket matches involving the New South Wales Blues. For the past two years it has hosted the FFA National Youth Championships.

The stadium hosted 2007 and 2013's City vs Country Origin rugby league match.

Touch Football
The stadium annually plays host to major events on the Touch Football calendar in Australia. The National Touch League is contested each year during March by the 13 permits from around Australia. The event features some of the best players from around Australia and the world.

Attendance records
Top 10 Sports Attendance Records

References

Sports venues in New South Wales
Cricket grounds in New South Wales
Sports venues completed in 1994
Coffs Harbour
1994 establishments in Australia